Anthony Mitchell may refer to:

 Anthony Mitchell (journalist) (died 2007), journalist for the Associated Press
 Anthony Mitchell (bishop) (1868–1917), bishop of Aberdeen and Orkney
 Anthony Mitchell (American football) (born 1974), former American football safety
 Anthony A. Mitchell (1918–2009), American conductor and clarinetist
 Anthony Mitchell (rugby league) (born 1989), Australian rugby league player

See also
 Tony Mitchell (disambiguation)

born 1954 retired warrant officer